Station fire may refer to:

 The Station nightclub fire, a 2003 Rhode Island nightclub fire
 Station Fire (2009), a Southern California wildfire